The 2022 United States Senate election in Alabama was held on November 8, 2022, to elect a member of the United States Senate to represent the State of Alabama. Incumbent Senator Richard Shelby was first elected in 1986 and re-elected in 1992 as a Democrat before switching to the Republican Party in 1994. In his most recent election in 2016, he was re-elected with 64% of the vote over Democrat Ron Crumpton. In February 2021, Shelby announced that he would not seek re-election to a seventh term, which resulted in the first open Senate seat since 1996 and the first in this seat since 1968.

Primary elections in Alabama were held on May 24, with Will Boyd securing the Democratic nomination. However, as none of the Republican candidates received at least 50% of the vote, a runoff election occurred on June 21 between the top two candidates of the first round: attorney Katie Britt and U.S. representative Mo Brooks. Britt won the runoff against Brooks and subsequently became the Republican nominee.

Britt's victory in the Republican Party primary was seen as tantamount to election in Alabama, which is a heavily Republican state. Britt won the general election and became the first elected female U.S. senator in the state's history.

Republican primary
Early polling showed U.S. Representative Mo Brooks as the frontrunner in the race, and he received the endorsement of former President Donald Trump. However, in November, the race started becoming increasingly closer with former chief of staff to incumbent Senator Richard Shelby, Katie Britt, running neck and neck with Brooks. In March 2022, businessman and former pilot Michael Durant took the lead in the race, with Brooks only just beginning to spend money on television advertisements. On March 23, 2022, with Brooks polling in third place, Trump revoked his endorsement, and promised to endorse a new candidate. In his official statement, Trump slammed Brooks for wanting to move past the 2020 United States presidential election, and claimed he went "woke" on it. Some have speculated that Trump's endorsement was withdrawn because he did not want to be associated with a losing campaign. Brooks claimed that Trump had told him to reinstate him as President and that Trump had been manipulated by Senate Minority Leader Mitch McConnell. Brooks has attacked Britt as allegedly being weak on illegal immigration and supporting higher taxes, while Brooks' critics frequently point to his long career in politics, having been in office for 40 years. In May, a planned debate between the three candidates was canceled after Durant declined to attend. A runoff election took place on June 21 as none of the candidates managed 50% of the vote needed to win the nomination outright, with Britt becoming the Republican nominee.

Candidates

Nominee
 Katie Britt, former president and CEO of the Business Council of Alabama and former chief of staff to outgoing Senator Richard Shelby

Eliminated in runoff

Eliminated in initial primary
 Lillie Boddie
 Karla DuPriest, businesswoman
 Michael Durant, businessman, former U.S. Army pilot, and author
 Jake Schafer, author and psychologist

Withdrawn
 Lynda Blanchard, United States Ambassador to Slovenia (2019–2021) (ran for governor)
 Mike Dunn, U.S. Marine Corps veteran (ran for Alabama Senate; endorsed Durant)

Declined
 Will Ainsworth, Lieutenant Governor of Alabama (2019–present) (ran for re-election)
 John Merrill, Alabama Secretary of State (2015–present) and candidate for U.S. Senate in 2020
 Jeff Sessions, former U.S. Attorney General (2017–2018) and former U.S. Senator (1997–2017)
 Richard Shelby, incumbent U.S. Senator (1987–2023) (endorsed Britt)

Endorsements

Debates and forums

First round

Polling 
Graphical summary

Aggregate polls

Results

Runoff

Polling 
Graphical summary

Katie Britt vs. Mike Durant

Mo Brooks vs. Mike Durant

Results

Democratic primary

Candidates

Nominee
 Will Boyd, pastor, former chair of the Lauderdale County Democratic Party, and perennial candidate

Eliminated in primary
 Brandaun Dean, principal at Campaign X Policy and former mayor of Brighton (2016–2017)
 Lanny Jackson, retired veteran, university administrator and candidate for mayor of Birmingham in 2017

Removed from ballot
 Victor Keith Williams, activist, former law instructor and Republican candidate for U.S. Senate in Virginia in 2020

Declined
 Doug Jones, former U.S. Senator (2018–2021)

Debates and forums

Endorsements

Polling

Results

Libertarian nomination
No primary was held for the Libertarian Party, and candidates were instead nominated by the party.

Candidates

Nominee 
 John Sophocleus, former Auburn University professor and nominee for governor in 2002

Independents

Candidates

Declared
 Adam Bowers, forestry professor at Lurleen B. Wallace Community College and U.S. Marine Corps veteran (unaffiliated, write-in)
 Jarmal Jabber Sanders, reverend (unaffiliated)

General election

Predictions

Endorsements

Polling

Results

See also
 List of United States senators from Alabama
2022 United States Senate elections
2022 United States House of Representatives elections in Alabama
2022 Alabama gubernatorial election
2022 Alabama lieutenant gubernatorial election
2022 Alabama Senate election
2022 Alabama House of Representatives election
2022 Alabama elections

Notes

Partisan clients

References

External links 
Official campaign websites
 Adam Bowers (I) for Senate
 Will Boyd (D) for Senate
 Katie Britt (R) for Senate
 John Sophocleus (L) for Senate

2022
Alabama
United States Senate